Brigant is a surname. Notable persons with this name include:

 Tomáš Brigant (born 1994), Slovak football player
 Niall Brigant, fictional character from The Southern Vampire Mysteries by author Charlaine Harris

See also
 Brigantes, Celtic tribe
 Brigand (disambiguation)